In the mathematical discipline of topology, the Brown–Gitler spectrum is a spectrum whose cohomology is a certain cyclic module over the Steenrod algebra.

Brown–Gitler spectra are defined by the isomorphism:

History 

The concept was introduced by mathematicians Edgar H. Brown and Samuel Gitler in a 1973 paper.

In topology, Brown–Gitler spectrum is related to the concepts of the Segal conjecture 
(proven in 1984) and the Burnside ring.

Applications 

Brown–Gitler spectra have had many important applications in homotopy theory.

References

External links

Topology